Ral guanine nucleotide dissociation stimulator is a protein that is encoded by the RALGDS gene in humans.

Interactions 

RALGDS has been shown to interact with:

 Arrestin beta 1,
 Arrestin beta 2, 
 HRAS, 
 KRAS, 
 MRAS, 
 RAP1A, 
 RAP2A, 
 RAPGEF2,  and
 RRAS.

References

Further reading